Wasp Branch is a tributary of Pine Creek in Luzerne County, Pennsylvania, in the United States. The stream is considered to be Class A Wild Trout Waters, a Coldwater Fishery, and a Migratory Fishery. Glacial till and bedrock consisting of stone and shale can be found in the stream's vicinity.

Course
Wasp Branch begins near the village of Mossville in Fairmount Township. It flows south-southeast and enters a valley within a few tenths of a mile. The stream then turns south, its valley gradually becoming deeper. After more than a mile, it reaches its confluence with Pine Creek.

Hydrology, geography and geology
The concentration of alkalinity in the headwaters of Wasp Branch is 12 milligrams per liter.

The stream is in the Susquehanna Lowlands section of the ridge and valley physiographical province.

For a significant portion of its length, Wasp Branch is on a glacial till known as Wisconsinan Till. However, Wisconsinan Ice-Contact Stratified Drift and alluvium are also found along portions of the stream. There is also bedrock made of sandstone and shale in its vicinity.

Watershed and history
The stream is in the United States Geological Survey quadrangle of Red Rock and Stillwater. Its source is in the former quadrangle and its mouth is in the latter one. The drainage basin is part of the Upper Central Susquehanna River Subbasin. The stream itself is near the community of Fairmount Springs.

Wasp Branch was entered into the Geographic Names Information System on August 2, 1979. Its identifier in the Geographic Names Information System is 1193614.

Biology
Wasp Branch is considered by the Pennsylvania Fish and Boat Commission to be Class A Wild Trout Waters for brook trout. It holds this designation from its headwaters to its mouth. The entire drainage basin of the stream is designated as a Coldwater Fishery and a Migratory Fishery. It is used as a High-Quality Coldwater Fishery and a Migratory Fishery.

A 1973 survey discovered no members of the Pteronarcyidae species Pteronarcys  biloba on Wasp Branch.

See also
Little Pine Creek (Luzerne and Columbia Counties, Pennsylvania), another tributary of Pine Creek
Brish Run, next tributary of Pine Creek going upstream
List of tributaries of Fishing Creek (North Branch Susquehanna River)

References

Rivers of Luzerne County, Pennsylvania
Tributaries of Fishing Creek (North Branch Susquehanna River)
Rivers of Pennsylvania